Chapter 4: Labor Pains is the fifth studio album by American singer Syleena Johnson. It was released digitally on December 23, 2008, and physically on January 13, 2009, on Johnson's own label, Aneelys Entertainment, after her departure from longtime record company Jive Records. Distribution was handled by Universal Music Group and Federal Distribution. Upon its release, Chapter 4 entered the US Billboard Top R&B/Hip-Hop Albums chart at number forty-two. Chapter 4s lead single was "It Is True", which was made available on iTunes on June 24, 2008, and impacted radio on July 1.

Critical reception

AllMusic editor James Steiner found that Chapter 4: Labor Pains was "Johnson's first attempt to grapple with the towering legacy of her father, Syl Johnson. While Syleena's previous albums featured smartly produced, forward-looking R&B, the retro flourishes of Chapter 4s "Shoo Fly," with its slow burning wah wah guitar, and Syleena's incredible interpretation of her father's gut-wrenching signature hit "Is It Because I'm Black," mark a fascinating and rewarding change of direction for this talented singer."

Track listing

Notes
 denotes additional producer
Sample credits
"Freedom" contains a sample of "Talkin Bout Freedom" as performed by Syl Johnson.
"Is It Because I'm Black" contains a sample of the same-titled song as performed by Syl Johnson.
"It Is True" contains elements of "Sparkle" as performed by Aretha Franklin.

Personnel
Credits adapted from the liner notes of Chapter 4: Labor Pains.

 flytedesign – art direction
 Syleena Johnson – A&R
 Steven Ledell – photography
 Slavic Livins – engineer, mixing, recording
 Herb Powers – mastering 
 Chris Steinmetz – mixing
 Frederick "Toxic" Taylor – engineer, recording
 Syleecia Thompson – A&R

Charts

Release history

References

External links

2008 albums
Syleena Johnson albums